Nuestra Belleza Nuevo León 2013, was held at Las Lomas Eventos in Monterrey, Nuevo León on July 16, 2013. At the conclusion of the final night of competition Vanesa Montemayr from Guadalupe was crowned the winner. Montemayor was crowned by outgoing Nuestra Belleza Nuevo León and Nuestra Belleza México titleholderCynthia Duque. Eight contestants competed for the title.

Results

Placements

Special Awards

Judges
Laura Elizondo - Nuestra Belleza México 2004
Jauma Mateu - Actor
Silvia Galván - Image Designer
Vero Solís - Fashion Designer
Felipe Ríos - IHG México Vicepresident
Ana Laura Corral - National Coordinator of Nuestra Belleza México
Dr. Jorge Torales

Background Music
Samo
Paty Cantú
Río Roma

Contestants

References

External links
Official Website

Nuestra Belleza México